Libya competed at the 2009 World Championships in Athletics from 15–23 August 2009 in Berlin. Two Libyan athletes were sent to the championships, but marathon runner El Zaidi did not start at his event.

Team selection

Track and road events

Results

Men
Track and road events

References

External links
Official competition website

Nations at the 2009 World Championships in Athletics
2009
World Championships in Athletics